Michael Foot was Leader of the Opposition from 4 November 1980, following his victory in the 1980 leadership election, to 2 October 1983, when he was replaced by Neil Kinnock at the 1983 leadership election. The 1980 election was triggered by James Callaghan's loss at the 1979 general election, and Foot's own disastrous defeat in the 1983 general election.

Until 2011, the Labour MPs elected the bulk of the membership of the Shadow Cabinet. The leader was expected to assign portfolios to those elected, but was able to assign portfolios to MPs not elected to the Shadow Cabinet and to refuse to assign portfolios to elected members. For example, William Rodgers was not given a portfolio despite winning in the 1980 Shadow Cabinet elections. When he left the party months later to help create the Social Democratic Party, Tony Benn automatically joined the Shadow Cabinet. Foot also chose not to give the more radical Benn a portfolio. When Benn lost in the 1981 Shadow Cabinet elections, all the new members received portfolios (Shadow Minister for Europe became a Shadow Cabinet post for the rest of Foot's tenure as leader).

Shadow Cabinet List

Initial Shadow Cabinet
Foot announced his first Shadow Cabinet on 8 December 1980, following the 1980 Shadow Cabinet elections.
Michael Foot – Leader of Her Majesty's Most Loyal Opposition
Denis Healey – Deputy Leader of the Labour Party and Shadow Foreign Secretary
Peter Shore – Shadow Chancellor of the Exchequer
Roy Hattersley – Shadow Home Secretary
John Silkin – Shadow Leader of the House of Commons
Brynmor John – Shadow Secretary of State for Defence
Stanley Orme – Shadow Secretary of State for Industry
Eric Varley – Shadow Secretary of State for Employment
Gerald Kaufman – Shadow Secretary of State for Environment
Merlyn Rees – Shadow Secretary of State for Energy
John Smith – Shadow Secretary of State for Trade
Albert Booth – Shadow Secretary of State for Transport
Roy Mason – Shadow Minister of Agriculture, Fisheries and Food
Neil Kinnock – Shadow Secretary of State for Education and Science
Norman Buchan – Shadow Secretary of State for Social Services
Gwyneth Dunwoody – Shadow Secretary of State for Health
Bruce Millan – Shadow Secretary of State for Scotland
Alec Jones – Shadow Secretary of State for Wales
Don Concannon – Shadow Secretary of State for Northern Ireland
Frank McElhone – Shadow Minister for Overseas Development
John Morris – Shadow Attorney General
William Rodgers – Shadow Minister without Portfolio
The Lord Peart – Leader of the Opposition in the House of Lords
Michael Cocks – Opposition Chief Whip in the House of Commons
The Baroness Llewelyn-Davies of Hastoe – Opposition Chief Whip in the House of Lords

Changes
27 January 1981: Rodgers resigned from the Shadow Cabinet and was replaced by Tony Benn. This came days after Rodgers, Shirley Williams, David Owen, and Roy Jenkins (the "Gang of Four") created the Council for Social Democracy, a step along the way to their creation of the Social Democratic Party.

1981 reshuffle
On 24 November 1981, after the 1981 Shadow Cabinet elections, Foot reshuffled the Shadow Cabinet. Brynmor John moved from Defence to Social Services and was replaced by Silkin, who retained the post of Shadow Leader of the House. Buchnan replaced Mason at Agriculture. Benn, Mason, and Morris were dropped from the Shadow Cabinet. Peter Archer and Eric Heffer joined the Shadow Cabinet as Shadow Attorney General and Shadow Minister for Europe, respectively.
Michael Foot – Leader of Her Majesty's Most Loyal Opposition
Denis Healey – Deputy Leader of the Labour Party and Shadow Foreign Secretary
Peter Shore – Shadow Chancellor of the Exchequer
Roy Hattersley – Shadow Home Secretary
John Silkin – Shadow Secretary of State for Defence and Shadow Leader of the House of Commons
Brynmor John – Shadow Secretary of State for Social Services
Stanley Orme – Shadow Secretary of State for Industry
Eric Varley – Shadow Secretary of State for Employment
Gerald Kaufman – Shadow Secretary of State for Environment
Merlyn Rees – Shadow Secretary of State for Energy
John Smith – Shadow Secretary of State for Trade
Albert Booth – Shadow Secretary of State for Transport
Norman Buchan – Shadow Minister of Agriculture, Fisheries and Food
Neil Kinnock – Shadow Secretary of State for Education and Science
Gwyneth Dunwoody – Shadow Secretary of State for Health
Bruce Millan – Shadow Secretary of State for Scotland
Alec Jones – Shadow Secretary of State for Wales
Don Concannon – Shadow Secretary of State for Northern Ireland
Frank McElhone – Shadow Minister for Overseas Development
Eric Heffer – Shadow Minister for Europe
Peter Archer – Shadow Attorney General
The Lord Peart – Leader of the Opposition in the House of Lords
Michael Cocks – Opposition Chief Whip in the House of Commons
The Baroness Llewelyn-Davies of Hastoe – Opposition Chief Whip in the House of Lords

Changes
22 September 1982: McElhone died, replaced by Guy Barnett.
4 November 1982: Lord Cledwyn of Penrhos defeated the incumbent leader in the Lords, Lord Peart, by 60–37. Lord Ponsonby of Shulbrede also succeeded Baroness Llewelyn-Davies as Lords Chief Whip for Labour.
24 November 1982: Foot conducted a mini-reshuffle following the 1982 Shadow Cabinet elections. Smith moved from Trade to Energy, and Rees moved to a "policy role". Archer replaced Smith at Trade. In turn, Arthur Davidson replaced him as Shadow Attorney General until he lost his seat in the 1983 General Election, when John Morris returned to the role of Shadow Attorney General (which he would hold through successive leaders until 1997, when he became Attorney General).
20 March 1983: Jones Died, replaced by Denzil Davies

References

Official Opposition (United Kingdom)
Foot
1980 establishments in the United Kingdom
1981 in the United Kingdom
1982 in the United Kingdom
1980 elections in the United Kingdom
1983 elections in the United Kingdom
1983 disestablishments in the United Kingdom
British shadow cabinets
Michael Foot